The British thermal unit (BTU or Btu) is a measure of heat, which is measured in units of energy.  It is defined as the amount of heat required to raise the temperature of one pound of water by one degree Fahrenheit. It is also part of the United States customary units. The modern SI unit for energy is the joule (J); one BTU equals about 1055 J (varying within the range 1054–1060 J depending on the specific definition; see below).

While units of heat are often supplanted by energy units in scientific work, they are still used in some fields. For example, in the United States the price of natural gas is quoted in dollars per the amount of natural gas that would give 1 million BTUs (1 "MMBtu") of heat energy if burned.

Definitions 
A BTU was originally defined as the amount of heat required to raise the temperature of 1 avoirdupois pound of liquid water by 1 degree Fahrenheit at a constant pressure of one atmospheric unit. There are several different definitions of the BTU that differ slightly. This reflects the fact that the temperature change of a mass of water due to the addition of a specific amount of heat (calculated in energy units, usually joules) depends slightly upon the water's initial temperature. As seen in the table below, definitions of the BTU based on different water temperatures vary by up to 0.5%.

Prefixes
Units kBtu are used in building energy use tracking and heating system sizing. Energy Use Index (EUI) represents kBtu per square foot of conditioned floor area. "k" stands for 1,000.

The unit Mbtu is used in natural gas and other industries to indicate 1,000 BTUs. However, there is an ambiguity in that the metric system (SI) uses the prefix "M" to indicate 'Mega-', one million (1,000,000). Even so, "MMbtu" is often used to indicate one million BTUs particularly in the oil and gas industry.

Energy analysts accustomed to the metric "k" ('kilo-') for 1,000 are more likely to use MBtu to represent one million, especially in documents where M represents one million in other energy or cost units, such as MW, MWh and $.

The unit 'therm' is used to represent 100,000 BTUs. A decatherm is 10 therms or one MMBtu (million Btu). The unit quad is commonly used to represent one quadrillion (1015) BTUs.

Conversions 
One Btu is approximately:
  (kilojoules)
  (watt hours)
  (calories)
  (kilocalories)
 25,031 to 25,160 ft⋅pdl (foot-poundal)
  (foot-pounds-force)
 5.40395 (lbf/in2)⋅ft3

A Btu can be approximated as the heat produced by burning a single wooden kitchen match or as the amount of energy it takes to lift a  weight .

For natural gas 

 In natural gas pricing, the Canadian definition is that  ≡ .
 The energy content (high or low heating value) of a volume of natural gas varies with the composition of the natural gas, which means there is no universal conversion factor for energy to volume.  of average natural gas yields ≈ 1030 Btu (between 1010 Btu and 1070 Btu, depending on quality, when burned)
 As a coarse approximation,  of natural gas yields ≈  ≈ .
 For natural gas price conversion  ≈ 36.9 million Btu and  ≈

BTU/h
The SI unit of power for heating and cooling systems is the watt. Btu per hour (Btu/h) is sometimes used in North America and the United Kingdom - the latter for air conditioning mainly, though "Btu/h" is sometimes abbreviated to just "Btu". MBH—thousands of Btus per hour—is also common.

 1 W is approximately 
 1,000 Btu/h is approximately 
 1 hp is approximately

Associated units 
It is the rate of heat transfer needed to freeze  of water into ice in 24 hours.
 In the United States and Canada, the R-value that describes the performance of thermal insulation is typically quoted in square foot degree Fahrenheit hours per British thermal unit (ft2⋅°F⋅h/Btu). For one square foot of the insulation, one BTU per hour of heat flows across the insulator for each degree of temperature difference across it.
 1 therm is defined in the United States and European Union as 100,000 BTU—but the U.S. uses the  while the EU uses the BTUIT. United Kingdom regulations were amended to replace therms with joules with effect from 1 January 2000.  the therm is still used in natural gas pricing in the United Kingdom.
 1 quad (short for quadrillion Btu) is 1015 Btu, which is about 1 exajoule. Quads are used in the United States for representing the annual energy consumption of large economies: for example, the U.S. economy used 99.75 quads in 2005. One quad/year is about 33.43 gigawatts.

The Btu should not be confused with the Board of Trade Unit (BTU), an obsolete UK synonym for kilowatt hour.

The Btu is often used to express the conversion-efficiency of heat into electrical energy in power plants. Figures are quoted in terms of the quantity of heat in Btu required to generate 1 kW⋅h of electrical energy.

The centigrade heat unit (CHU) is the amount of heat required to raise the temperature of one pound of water by one Celsius degree. It is equal to 1.8 BTU or 1,899 joules.  In 1974, this unit was "still sometimes used" in the United Kingdom as an alternative to BTU.

Another legacy unit for energy in the metric system is the calorie, which is defined as the amount of heat required to raise the temperature of one gram of water by one degree Celsius.

See also 
Conversion of units
Latent heat
Metrication
Ton of refrigeration

Notes

References

External links 
 
 

Units of energy
Imperial units
Customary units of measurement in the United States